Wazed, Wazedu or Wazeed is a mandal in Jayashankar Bhupalpally district of Telangana. Previously, Wazedu belonged to Nugur Taluka of East Godavari District.

Demographics
According to Indian census, 2001, the demographic details of Wazeed mandal is as follows:
 Total Population: 	23,545	in 5,690 Households. 	
 Male Population: 	11,753	and Female Population: 	11,792		
 Children Under 6-years of age: 3,516	(Boys - 1,787	and Girls -	1,729)
 Total Literates: 	9,889

Villages
The villages in Wazeed mandal include:
  Cherukur  	
  Chintoor 	
  Edjarlapalli 	
  Gummadidoddi 	
  Kongala 	
  Krishnapuram 	
  Murmur 	
  Nagaram
 Peruru 	
  Wazeed
  Chandrupatla
 lingapeta
 China Gangaram
 Tekulagudem

References

Mandals in Jayashankar Bhupalpally district